Aleksandr Vladimirovich Dvornikov (born 22 August 1961) is a Russian Ground Forces army general who commanded the Russian military intervention in Syria and the 2022 Russian invasion of Ukraine.

After joining the Soviet Army in 1978, Dvornikov rose through the ranks of the Soviet and then Russian army over a period of thirty years. In 2015, he became commander of the Russian Armed Forces in Syria during the Russian military intervention there. At that time he cemented a reputation for the harsh conduct of his military campaigns as those in Chechnya before. 

In April 2022, Dvornikov was placed in charge of military operations during the 2022 Russian invasion of Ukraine, until he was replaced with Army general Sergei Surovikin on October 8, 2022.

Early life and Soviet military career 
Dvornikov was born on 22 August 1961 in Ussuriysk. He graduated from the Ussuriysk Suvorov Military School in 1978 and joined the Soviet Army. Dvornikov received further education at the Moscow High Command Training School, graduating in 1982. From 1982, he served in the Far Eastern Military District as a platoon and then company commander, and as a battalion chief of staff. In 1991, Dvornikov graduated from the Frunze Military Academy. He became a deputy battalion commander in the Western Group of Forces.

Russian military career

Career in the Russian Ground Forces 
Between 1992 and 1994, Dvornikov commanded the 154th Separate Motor Rifle Battalion of the 6th Separate Guards Motor Rifle Brigade. In 1995, he became chief of staff and deputy commander of the 10th Guards Tank Division's 248th Motor Rifle Regiment. Dvornikov became regimental commander in 1996. On 20 January 1996, he was awarded the Order of Military Merit. On 2 February 1996, he was awarded the Order of Courage.

In 1997, he transferred to command the 1st Guards Motor Rifle Regiment of the 2nd Guards Tamanskaya Motor Rifle Division in the Moscow Military District. Between 2000 and 2003 he was chief of staff and then commander of the 19th Motor Rifle Division in the North Caucasus Military District. On 6 May 2000, he was awarded the Order "For Merit to the Fatherland" 4th class with swords. Dvornikov graduated from the Military Academy of the General Staff in 2005.

In 2005, Dvornikov became deputy commander and chief of staff of the 36th Army in the Siberian Military District. In 2008, he took command of the 5th Red Banner Army. Dvornikov became deputy commander of the Eastern Military District in 2011. From May 2012 to June 2016, he served as chief of staff and first deputy commander of the Central Military District. Between November and December 2012, he was acting commander of the district. 

On 13 December 2012, Dvornikov became a lieutenant general. On 13 December 2014, he was promoted to colonel general.

Syrian civil war

In September 2015, Dvornikov became the first commander of the Russian Armed Forces in Syria during the Russian military intervention in Syria. On 17 March 2016, he was awarded the title Hero of the Russian Federation for his leadership.

In July 2016, Dvornikov became the Southern Military District's acting commander. He was confirmed in the position on 20 September 2016.

In March 2019, the European Union enacted sanctions on him due to his role in the Kerch Strait incident.

By a decree from President Putin, Dvornikov was promoted to the rank of army general on 23 June 2020.

Russian invasion of Ukraine
On 10 April 2022, Dvornikov was placed in complete charge of military operations during the 2022 Russian invasion of Ukraine. Before his appointment, there had not been a single military leader for all Russian forces; he had been one of several in charge of various fronts.

On 3 June 2022 it was reported by the open-source intelligence group Conflict Intelligence Team, citing Russian soldiers, that Dvornikov had been replaced by Colonel General Gennady Zhidko in command of the invasion. However, on 5 June Ukrainian governor of Luhansk Oblast Serhiy Haidai said Dvornikov was still in command and had been given until 10 June by his superiors to complete the Battle of Severodonetsk. 

On 25 June 2022, it was again reported that Dvornikov had been dismissed from his post.

On 8 October 2022, the Russian Defence Ministry named Air Force General Sergei Surovikin as the overall commander of Russian forces fighting in Ukraine without naming who Surovikin was replacing.

Military reputation
Dvornikov's military reputation is often cited in the international press for the harsh conduct of his military campaigns, particularly in Chechnya and Syria. He has been accused of having pursued scorched earth tactics. Retired US Navy Admiral James G. Stavridis spoke in an interview of what he said was a known epiphet of Dvornikov, "Butcher of Syria".

However, the Institute for the Study of War has noted that although Dvornikov's tenure was marked by large numbers of civilian deaths, it was not especially bloody compared to the operation as a whole, as the Russian military targeted Syrian civilians and critical infrastructure throughout its intervention in Syria. According to an investigation by Cathrin Schaer and Emad Hassan published in the German state-funded media Deutsche Welle, statistics also show that Dvornikov did not open up a new and more violent chapter in the Syrian war.

References 

1961 births
Living people
People from Ussuriysk
Frunze Military Academy alumni
Military Academy of the General Staff of the Armed Forces of Russia alumni
Heroes of the Russian Federation
Recipients of the Medal of the Order "For Merit to the Fatherland" II class
Recipients of the Order "For Merit to the Fatherland", 2nd class
Recipients of the Order "For Service to the Homeland in the Armed Forces of the USSR", 3rd class
Recipients of the Order of Courage
Recipients of the Order of Military Merit (Russia)
Generals of the army (Russia)
Russian individuals subject to European Union sanctions
Russian military personnel of the Syrian civil war
Soviet Army officers
Russian military personnel of the 2022 Russian invasion of Ukraine